is a fictional character from Nintendo's The Legend of Zelda series. She first appeared as one of the major characters in the 2017 action-adventure game The Legend of Zelda: Breath of the Wild where she is the leader of the Gerudo and one of the four Champions who help Princess Zelda and Link to protect Hyrule from Calamity Ganon. She also appears in the 2020 hack-and-slash video game Hyrule Warriors: Age of Calamity as a playable character. Within the lore of the game series, Urbosa is the brave pilot of Divine Beast Vah Naboris, one of the four Divine Beasts that the Champions use to help Zelda protect Hyrule from Calamity Ganon. Like the other Champions, Urbosa has a unique skill that is used in gameplay, which is the ability to control the power of lightning. She has been positively received by both fans and critics due to her heroic, wise and charismatic character.

Concept and creation
Game Director Hidemaro Fujibayashi mentioned Urbosa as a favourite character in a behind-the-scenes featurette and stated that her name was the first to be finalised during the development of Breath of the Wild.

Character design
As a member of the Gerudo race, Urbosa was designed with some common traits of her people. She has dark skin and red hair. She also has green eyes and blue lips. She wears a multicolored breastplate made of gold with two shoulder guards. Her gold belt supports her blue skirt, symbolizing that she is one of the Champions of Hyrule. She wears green high-heels and several gold jewels. Hyrule Warriors: Age of Calamity depicts Urbosa at a point in the storyline when she serves as Gerudo Chief before being named the Gerudo Champion. She wears the Chief's crown, which is identical to the one Riju wears as Chief in Breath of the Wild, and a black skirt with the Gerudo symbol on it. She keeps her signature weapon, the Scimitar of the Seven and her Daybreaker shield holstered to the back of her body. Urbosa has been noted for her tall stature and muscular build, which are common traits of the Gerudo.

Portrayal
In both Breath of the Wild and Hyrule Warriors: Age of Calamity Urbosa is voiced in English by Elizabeth Maxwell. She is voiced in Japanese by Rei Shimoda.

Characteristics
Urbosa is the Chief of the Gerudo and a fierce leader. She is also the pilot of the Divine Beast of lightning, Vah Naboris. She has the ability to control the power of lightning. She wields her sword in battle, which shoots out green lightning, creating electrical storms to take down enemies. She can also snap her fingers to instantly destroy enemies with a bolt of lightning. Urbosa is depicted as a calm and confident authoritative figure, but also possesses great wit and a caring nature towards Zelda. She supports Zelda when she doubts her ability to unveil her power and does not hesitate to defend Link against Revali. In the backstory of Breath of the Wild, Urbosa is determined to come to the aid of Zelda in defence of Hyrule against Calamity Ganon, partly motivated by her personal resentment for Ganon's legacy (in his previous form as Ganondorf) as the only Gerudo male born in 100 years. As leader of the Gerudo, she is willing to risk her own life to protect her people by agreeing to pilot one of the Divine Beasts, despite her people pleading with her that it is too dangerous. In Link's sixth memory, shown in the form of a cutscene in Breath of the Wild, Urbosa displays great wisdom and inner strength, and also a special connection with Zelda, while watching over her as she sleeps. Urbosa is related to Riju, the current Gerudo Chief and her direct descendent who appears in the present-day storyline of Breath of the Wild.

Like the other Champions, Urbosa has a unique skill that the player uses during gameplay. In Breath of the Wild, Urbosa bestows a skill upon Link named Urbosa's Fury, which is a powerful lightning attack. In Hyrule Warriors: Age of Calamity, Urbosa can charge up her lightning to create a stronger attack on enemies.

Appearances

The Legend of Zelda: Breath of the Wild
Urbosa appears in The Legend of Zelda: Breath of the Wild as one of its major characters. She is one of four Champions - including Mipha, Revali and Daruk - who are tasked with helping Princess Zelda and Link to protect Hyrule from Calamity Ganon. In the game's backstory, she commands one of the four Divine Beasts named Vah Naboris, an ancient technology, but Calamity Ganon manages to take control of the Divine Beasts, resulting in her death and the death of the other Champions with the exception of Link, who is put in a 100-year slumber. When Link awakens, he can go to Vah Naboris to try to tame it, and there he meets the spirit of Urbosa, who helps to guide him in the innards of the Divine Beast.

Urbosa plays a major role in the backstory of Breath of the Wild, which is revealed to the player through cutscenes and Urbosa's diary entries. Urbosa is shown to have had a special connection with Zelda's mother, the Queen of Hyrule and this friendship is reflected in the support that she offers to Zelda. Urbosa displays maternal instincts towards Zelda, calling her by her nickname, "Little bird", which is a term of endearment. She also plays a motherly role in relation to other characters in the game, including Link and the other Champions. Urbosa is shown to be a strong supporter of the relationship between Link and Zelda and plays an active role in bringing them closer together. Her diary entries also reveal that she is willing to break the rules to help Link and Zelda's relationship by teaching Link how to enter Gerudo Town without getting thrown out for being male. Urbosa's supportive role continues after her death, specifically when her spirit appears in Breath of the Wild to encourage Link to destroy Calamity Ganon.

Hyrule Warriors: Age of Calamity
Urbosa reappears as a playable character in Hyrule Warriors: Age of Calamity. The game acts as a prequel with events being set 100 years before Breath of the Wild. The storyline takes place in an alternate timeline created when Terrako, a small Guardian that Zelda built in her childhood, time-travels into the past to prevent Hyrule's fate in the Breath of the Wild timeline. Urbosa arrives home to Gerudo Town just as Master Kohga, leader of the Yiga Clan, is about to strike down Zelda while disguised as Urbosa, only to be electrocuted into submission by Urbosa herself. Though Kohga later escapes thanks to his right-hand Sooga, Urbosa, due to her close friendship with Zelda, agrees to pilot Vah Naboris against the Calamity. After Zelda and Link gather the other Champions, they travel to Korok Forest to meet with the Great Deku Tree and recover the Master Sword, encountering Astor, the seer siding with the Yiga and Calamity Ganon. After recovering the Master Sword, Zelda voices her concern about Link changing after getting the Blade of Evil's Bane but Urbosa assures her that Link is still the same boy who served in the Hyrulean Army. Urbosa is then dubbed the Gerudo Champion and returns to pilot Vah Naboris to locate the Yiga Clan's hideout. Though Kohga and Sooga escape again, Urbosa returns to Gerudo Town to prepare for the Calamity's return as King Rhoam orders the civilians to evacuate and has the soldiers transferred to Hyrule's two main strongholds, Akkala Citadel and Fort Hateno, to reinforce the garrisons.

When Calamity Ganon awakens, Urbosa is cut off from the other Champions and Hyrule Castle when Ganon shuts down the Sheikah Towers' teleportation ability, and soon finds herself fighting a stronger Thunderblight Ganon sent to take over Vah Naboris. Before she can be killed by the Blight Ganon like in the original timeline, she is saved by Riju and Patricia, summoned from the future by Terrako to protect Urbosa until Link arrives to aid them in destroying Thunderblight Ganon, keeping Vah Naboris under Urbosa's control. Joined by the other Champions and their Divine Beasts after they too were saved by the future Champions, they protect Akkala Citadel and Fort Hateno from the Calamity's forces, saving the Hyrulean Army in the process, and then defend the Great Plateau, where King Rhoam is revealed to have survived as well. After Purah summons Urbosa's Gerudo warrior women to bolster the Hyrulean Army with the Rito, Gorons, and Zoras, along with a reformed Master Kohga and the Yiga Clan, Zelda leads the full-scale assault to reclaim Hyrule Castle from the Calamity. Urbosa helps to defeat Astor and the Harbinger Ganon, that timeline's Terrako possessed by Malice from the future, before then facing Calamity Ganon. After the future Terrako sacrifices itself to weaken Calamity Ganon, Link delivers the finishing blow with the Master Sword, while Zelda uses her awakened power from the Triforce to seal away Calamity Ganon, winning the war in Hyrule's favor. Afterwards, Urbosa bids Riju and Patricia goodbye as, with their job done, they are returned to their own timeline with Yunobo, Sidon, and Teba, leaving Robbie and Purah to rebuild Terrako and reunite him with Zelda.

Other media
Urbosa appears in Super Smash Bros. Ultimate as a Spirit.

Merchandise
For the release of The Legend of Zelda: Breath of the Wild, Nintendo released Urbosa's Amiibo.

Reception
Urbosa has received a generally positive reception. Holly Green of Paste Magazine considered her one of the best new characters of 2017, describing her as having the "hip, disaffected charisma of a cowboy, with an aloof but affable charm". Rich Meister of Destructoid also held her as one of his favorite characters of 2017, while fellow Destructoid contributor Pixie the Fairy called her a recent favorite. Pixie was "awed" by her when they played Breath of the Wild, citing how she is both "heroic and fearsome" and "gentle, perceptive and wise". Hussain Almahr of Vice called her "amazing" while feeling that Arabic themes in the Gerudo were not represented adequately in the game. Kent Springborn Jr. of The Collegian praised her voice actress as a standout among the cast of Breath of the Wild. Urbosa has been a popular choice for Super Smash Bros. Ultimate, either as a group with the other Champions or on her own. Will Greenwald of Geek.com wanted her in despite his distaste for sword users in Super Smash Bros. He praised her as sexually attractive and praised her for being a "warm, supportive leader" and for helping raise Zelda and protecting Hyrule. Xavier Harding of Mic suggested that Urbosa would be a good choice to add further representation of Breath of the Wild to Super Smash Bros. He also discussed Urbosa as a person of color, praising her personality and calling her the Beyoncé of the Gerudo race. Zelda's voice actress, Patricia Summersett, regarded Urbosa as her favorite Champion in the game, while Kyle Hilliard of Game Informer found her design to be the best of the Champions. In her review of Hyrule Warriors: Age Of Calamity for Kotaku, Ash Parrish singled out the option to play as Urbosa to be the singular highlight of the game for her. 

Screen Rant listed Urbosa in fifth place in a list of the 10 most powerful female characters in The Legend of Zelda, stating that she has been "unanimously praised" and a "fan favourite". Ryan Stevens of Cultured Vultures listed Urbosa in eighth place in a list of "10 best giant women in video games", remarking that she "towers over Link, who is supposedly the hero of legend. She's also ruthlessly good at everything we see her do in flashbacks, making her a fan favorite character". Daniel Alexander for The Gamer listed Urbosa in second place on a list of "the 10 best new characters in Breath of the Wild, commenting that "her strong will and maternal attachment to Zelda are apparent, making her one of the most interesting of the four Champions". Due to her popularity with fans, Urbosa has been the subject of many pieces of fan art and has also been recreated in cosplay form.

See also
 Characters of The Legend of Zelda

Notes

References

Female characters in video games
Fictional swordfighters in video games
The Legend of Zelda characters
Nintendo protagonists
Woman soldier and warrior characters in video games
Fictional tribal chiefs
Video game characters introduced in 2017
Video game characters with electric or magnetic abilities
Fictional murdered people